Doctor Evelyn Stocking Crosslin (1919–1991) was an American physician. She was named to the Florida Women's Hall of Fame in 1995.

Life
She was born Evelyn Stocking in Daytona Beach and was educated at Bethune-Cookman College. Because African-Americans were not admitted to Florida medical schools at the time, she earned her MD from Meharry Medical College in Tennessee. She was the first African-American woman to practice medicine in Volusia County. She married Doctor Neill Crosslin. Crosslin practised 47 years at the Halifax Medical Center in Daytona Beach. She also operated her own practice and worked at the Daytona Beach Public Health Unit's Well Baby Clinic for 30 years.

Crosslin and her husband have been credited with providing quality medical services to people who couldn't afford private medical care. The Halifax Crosslin Health Center was opened in 1994 to honor their contributions; fees at the center are set based on income.

References 

1919 births
1991 deaths
Physicians from Florida
African-American physicians
20th-century American women physicians
20th-century American physicians
20th-century women scientists
20th-century African-American women
20th-century African-American people
20th-century American people